Emahoy Tsegué-Maryam Guèbrou (Gəʿəz ፅጌ ማርያም ገብሩ; born Yewubdar Gebru, December 12, 1923) is an Ethiopian nun known for her piano playing and compositions.

Biography 
Guèbrou was born as Yewubdar Gebru in Addis Ababa, on December 12, 1923, to a wealthy Amhara family. At the age of six she was sent to a boarding school in Switzerland, where she studied violin. In 1933 she returned to Ethiopia, where she was a civil servant and singer to Haile Selassie.  During the Second Italo-Ethiopian War she and her family were prisoners of war and were sent by the Italians to the prison camp on the Italian island of Asinara and later to Mercogliano, near Naples. After the war Guèbrou studied under the Polish violinist Alexander Kontorowicz in Cairo. Kontorowicz and Guèbrou returned to Ethiopia where Kontorowicz was appointed as musical director of the band of the Imperial Body Guard. Guèbrou was employed as an administrative assistant. Her first record was released in 1967.

The Emahoy Tsege Mariam Music Foundation has been set up to help children in need both in Africa and in the Washington, D.C. metro area to study music. In April 2017 Guèbrou was the subject of a BBC Radio 4 documentary, introduced by Kate Molleson, entitled The Honky Tonk Nun.

Music 
A compilation of Guèbrou's work was issued on the Éthiopiques record label. She also appeared on The Rough Guide to the Music of Ethiopia, and The Rough Guide to African Lullabies.  Her music has been described as melodic blues piano with rhythmically complex phrasing. For three decades she lived a reclusive life with only rare performances including one at the Jewish Community Center in Washington, D.C. on July 12, 2008. Three tribute concerts were held in Jerusalem in 2013 to mark her 90th birthday and a compilation of her musical scores was released.

In Popular Media 
In 2019, an ad campaign entitled 'Coming Home' for Amazon’s Echo Auto and Echo Smart Speaker created by advertising agency Wongdoody featured a song by Guebrou titled 'Homesickness'.  Her music was featured in the soundtrack of the 2020 documentary Time. Two of her compositions were also featured in the 2021 Netflix movie Passing: 'The Homeless Wanderer' (used in the official trailer) and 'The Last Tears of a Deceased'.

References

External links
'The extraordinary life of Ethiopia's 93-year-old singing nun' published by The Guardian, 17 April 2017
"Emahoy Tsegué-Maryam Guèbrou" published by Boing Boing, 19 March 2010

1923 births
Living people
Ethiopian Oriental Orthodox Christians
People from Addis Ababa
20th-century pianists
Ethiopian nuns
20th-century Christian nuns
Oriental Orthodox nuns
Ethiopian composers
20th-century composers
20th-century women composers
21st-century composers
21st-century women composers
20th-century women pianists
21st-century women pianists